Schkortleben is a village and a former municipality in the Burgenlandkreis district, in Saxony-Anhalt, Germany. Since 1 September 2010, it is part of the town of Weißenfels. Until then, the village of Kriechau used to be part of Schkortleben.

Pictures of Kriechau

References

Former municipalities in Saxony-Anhalt
Weißenfels